9910 Vogelweide, provisional designation , is a stony Koronian asteroid and elongated slow rotator from the outer regions of the asteroid belt, approximately 5 kilometers in diameter. It was discovered during the second Palomar–Leiden trojan survey in 1973, and named after German medieval poet Walther von der Vogelweide.

Discovery 

Vogelweide was discovered on 30 September 1973, by the Dutch astronomers Ingrid and Cornelis van Houten, on photographic plates taken by Dutch–American astronomer Tom Gehrels at Palomar Observatory in California, United States.

Trojan survey 

The survey designation "T-2" stands for the second Palomar–Leiden Trojan survey, named after the fruitful collaboration of the Palomar and Leiden Observatory in the 1960s and 1970s. Gehrels used Palomar's Samuel Oschin telescope (also known as the 48-inch Schmidt Telescope), and shipped the photographic plates to Ingrid and Cornelis van Houten at Leiden Observatory where astrometry was carried out. The trio are credited with the discovery of several thousand minor planets.

Classification and orbit 

Vogelweide is a stony asteroid and member of the Koronis family, a group consisting of few hundred known bodies with nearly ecliptical orbits. It orbits the Sun in the outer main-belt at a distance of 2.8–3.0 AU once every 4 years and 10 months (1,778 days). Its orbit has an eccentricity of 0.03 and an inclination of 3° with respect to the ecliptic.

Physical characteristics

Slow rotator 

In September 2012, two rotational lightcurves of Vogelweide were obtained from photometric observations at the Palomar Transient Factory in California. Lightcurve analysis gave a rotation period of 117.438 and 118.905 hours with a brightness variation of 0.74 and 0.67 magnitude in the R and S-band, respectively. Vogelweide is a slow rotator, as most asteroids have spin rates of less than 20 hours. The relatively high brightness amplitude also indicates that the body has a non-spheroidal shape.

Diameter and albedo 

According to the survey carried out by NASA's Wide-field Infrared Survey Explorer with its subsequent NEOWISE mission, Vogelweide measures 5.991 kilometers in diameter and its surface has an albedo of 0.196. The Collaborative Asteroid Lightcurve Link assumes a standard albedo for stony Koronian asteroids of 0.24 and derives a diameter of 4.94 kilometers with an absolute magnitude of 13.7.

Naming 

This minor planet was named for Walther von der Vogelweide (c. 1170 – c. 1230) a German minstrel of the 13th century and popular lyric poet of Middle High German. The approved naming citation was published by the Minor Planet Center on 2 April 1999.

References

External links 
 Asteroid Lightcurve Database (LCDB), query form (info )
 Dictionary of Minor Planet Names, Google books
 Asteroids and comets rotation curves, CdR – Observatoire de Genève, Raoul Behrend
 Discovery Circumstances: Numbered Minor Planets (5001)-(10000) – Minor Planet Center
 
 

009910
Discoveries by Cornelis Johannes van Houten
Discoveries by Ingrid van Houten-Groeneveld
Discoveries by Tom Gehrels
3181
Named minor planets
2115
009910
19730930